Corazón en Condominio (Heart in Condominium) is a Mexican telenovela produced by Azteca in 2013. It stars Victor García and Cynthia Rodríguez as the main protagonists. It is based on Vecinos, a Colombian telenovela by Caracol. On 2 September 2013, Azteca started broadcasting Corazón en Condominio at 7:30pm, replacing Destino. The last episode was broadcast on 29 March 2014.

Episodes

References

Lists of Mexican television series episodes